John Brantley Crawley (February 28, 1940 – June 4, 2013) was an American jurist and lawyer.

John Brantley Crawley was born in Troy, Alabama, on February 28, 1940. He grew up with his twin brother Larry, his sister Nancy, and his younger brother William in Pike County. His parents are the late Wonnie Bowden Crawley and the late William Douglas Crawley.

Judge Crawley is a graduate of The University of Alabama and The University of Alabama School of Law. He served as a law clerk on the Court of Appeals of Alabama for Judge George Johnson, and he then served and Assistant Attorney General assigned to the Alabama Department of Revenue. He practiced law with John J. Martin in Dothan and, in 1969, returned to Pike County. While practicing law in Troy, he helped establish Hand-In-Hand, a nonprofit organization devoted to helping handicapped students. In April 1991, he was appointed Circuit Judge of the 12th Judicial Circuit by Governor Guy Hunt and served until January 1993. He then resumed his law practice until he was elected to the Court of Civil Appeals and took office in January 1995. He was re-elected in November 2000.

Judge Crawley served on the Alabama Supreme Court's Task Force on Judicial Elections. He currently serves on the Supreme Court Standing Committee on the Alabama Rules of Juvenile Procedure, the Alabama State Bar Committee on Alternative Methods of Dispute Resolution, and the State Agency ADR Task Force. He is a member of the Judicial Inquiry Commission, having been appointed to that position by the Alabama Supreme Court. He is the author of "Is The Honeymoon Over for Common-Law Marriage: A Consideration of the Continued Viability of the Common-Law Marriage Doctrine," published in the Cumberland Law Review.

Notes

1940 births
2013 deaths
People from Troy, Alabama
University of Alabama alumni
University of Alabama School of Law alumni
Alabama state court judges
20th-century American judges